The Evil Hour  is a novel by Colombian writer Gabriel García Márquez, first published (in an edition disowned by the author) in 1962.

Written while García Márquez lived in Paris, the story was originally entitled Este pueblo de mierda (This Town of Shit or This Shitty Town).  Rewritten, it won a literary prize in Colombia.

Some of the same characters and situations found in La mala hora later re-appear in Cien años de soledad.

Plot 

The Evil Hour takes place in a nameless Colombian village. Someone has been placing satirical pasquinades about the town, outlining the locals' shameful secrets.  Some dismiss these as common gossip.  However, when a man kills his wife's supposed lover after reading of her infidelity, the mayor decides that action is called for.  He declares martial law and sends soldiers (who are actually armed thugs) to patrol the streets.  He also uses the 'state of unrest' as an excuse to crack down on his political enemies.

References 

 Dabove, Juan Pablo. “Los pasquines como alegoría de la disolución de la ciudadanía en La mala hora, de Gabriel García Márquez”. Revista de crítica literaria latinoamericana  XXVI.52: 269-287.
 Lydia Hazera, "Estructura y tematica de La mala hora de Gabriel Garcia Marquez." Thesaurus: Boletin del Instituto Caro y Cuervo 28 (1973): 471-81.

External links
 In Evil Hour  at "The Modern Word"'s García Márquez website.

1962 novels
1962 debut novels
20th-century Colombian novels
Harper & Row books
Novels by Gabriel García Márquez
Novels set in Colombia